Liquid crystal polymers (LCPs) are polymers with the property of liquid crystal, usually containing aromatic rings as mesogens. Despite uncrosslinked LCPs, polymeric materials like liquid crystal elastomers (LCEs) and liquid crystal networks (LCNs) can exhibit liquid crystallinity as well. They are both crosslinked LCPs but have different cross link density. They are widely used in the digital display market. In addition, LCPs have unique properties like thermal actuation, anisotropic swelling, and soft elasticity. Therefore, they can be good actuators and sensors. One of the most famous and classical applications for LCPs is Kevlar, a strong but light fiber with wide applications, notably bulletproof vests.

Background

Liquid crystallinity in polymers may occur either by dissolving a polymer in a solvent (lyotropic liquid-crystal polymers) or by heating a polymer above its glass or melting transition point (thermotropic liquid-crystal polymers). Liquid-crystal polymers are present in melted/liquid or solid form. In solid form the main example of lyotropic LCPs is the commercial aramid known as Kevlar. Chemical structure of this aramid consists of linearly substituted aromatic rings linked by amide groups. In a similar way, several series of thermotropic LCPs have been commercially produced by several companies (e.g., Vectra / Celanese).

A high number of LCPs, produced in the 1980s, displayed order in the melt phase analogous to that exhibited by nonpolymeric liquid crystals. Processing of LCPs from liquid-crystal phases (or mesophases) gives rise to fibers and injected materials having high mechanical properties as a consequence of the self-reinforcing properties derived from the macromolecular orientation in the mesophase.

Today, LCPs can be melt-processed on conventional equipment at high speeds with excellent replication of mold details. In fact, the high ease of forming of LCPs is an important competitive advantage against other plastics, as it offsets high raw material cost.

The class of polar and bowlic LCPs, with unique properties and important potential applications, remains to be exploited.

Mesophases 
Same as the small molecular liquid crystal, liquid crystal polymers also have different mesophases. The mesogen cores of the polymers will aggregate into different mesophases: nematics, cholesterics, smectics and compounds with highly polar end groups. More information about the mesophases can be found on liquid crystal page.

Classification 

LCPs are categorized by the location of liquid crystal cores. Main chain liquid crystal polymers (MCLCPs), as the name indicates, have liquid crystal cores in the main chain. To contrast, side chain liquid crystal polymers (SCLCPs) have pendant side chains containing the liquid crystal cores. The basic structures for these two kinds of LCPs are shown in the figure.

Main chain LCP 
Main chain LCPs have rigid, rod-like mesogens in the polymer backbones, which indirectly leads to the high melting temperature of this kind of LCPs. To make this kind of polymer easy to process, different methods are applied to lower the transition temperature: (1) Introducing flexible sequences; (2) Introducing bends or kinks; (3) Adding substituent groups to the aromatic mesogens...

Side Chain LCP 
In side chain LCPs, the mesogens are in the polymer side chains. The mesogens usually are linked to the backbones through flexible spacers (Although for a few LCPs, the side chains directly link to the backbones). If the mesogens are directly linked to the backbones, the coil-like conformation of the backbones will impede the mesogens from forming an orientational structure. However, by introducing flexible spacers between the backbones and the mesogens, the ordering of mesogens can be decoupled from the conformation of the backbones.

Becasause of the researcher's effort, more and more LCPs of different structures are synthesized. Therefore, latin letters are used to help the classification of LCPs.

Mechanism 

Mesogens in LCPs can self-organize to form liquid crystal regions in different conditions. Based on the mechanism of aggregation and ordering, LCPs can be roughly divided into two subcategories as shown below. However, the distinction is not rigidly defined. LCPs can be transformed into liquid crystals with more than one method.

Lyotropic systems 
Lyotropic main chain LCPs have rigid mesogen cores (like aromatic rings) in the backbones. This kind of LCPs forms liquid crystals due to their rigid chain conformation but not only the aggregation of mesogen cores. Because of the rigid structure, strong solvent is needed to dissolve the lyotropic main chain polymers. When the concentration of the polymers reaches critical concentration, the mesophases begin to form and the viscosity of the polymer solution begins to decrease. Lyotropic main chain LCPs have been mainly used to generate high-strength fibers such as Kevlar.

Side chain LCPs usually consist of both hydrophobic and hydrophilic segments. Usually, the side chain ends are hydrophilic. When they are dissolved in water, micelles will form due to hydrophobic force. If the volume fraction of the polymers exceeds the critical volume fraction, the micellar segregates will be packed to form a liquid crystal structure. As the concentration varies above the critical volume fraction, the liquid crystal generated may have different packing ways. Temperature, the stiffness of the polymers, molecular weight of the polymers can affect the liquid crystal transformation. Lyotropic side chain LCPs like alkyl polyoxyethylene surfactants attached to polysiloxane polymers may be applied to personal care products like liquid soap etc.

Thermotropic systems 
The study of thermotropic LCPs is inspired by the success of the lyotropic LCPs. This kind of LCPs can only be processable when the melting temperature is far below the decomposition temperature. Above the melting temperature and glass transition temperature and below the clearing point, the thermotropic LCPs will form liquid crystals. After the clearing point, the melt will be isotropic and clear again. What is different from the small molecular liquid crystals is that we can get frozen liquid crystals by quenching the liquid crystal polymers below the glass transition temperature. Moreover, we can use copolymerization to adjust the melting temperature and mesophase temperature.

There are other systems like phototropic systems.

Liquid crystal elastomers (LCEs) 
Finkelmann first proposed LCEs in 1981. LCEs attracted attention from researchers and industry. LCEs can be synthesized both from polymeric precursors and from monomers. LCEs can respond to heat, light, and magnetic fields. Nanomaterials can be introduced into LCE matrices (LCE-based composites) to provide different properties and tailor LCEs' ability to respond to different stimuli.

Applications 
LCEs have many applications. For example, LCE films can be used as optical retarders due to their anisotropic structure. Because they can control the polarization state of transmitted light, they are commonly used in 3D glasses, patterned retarders for transflective displays, and flat panel LC displays. Modifying LCE with azobenzene, allows it to show light response properties. It can be applied for controlled wettability, autonomous lenses, and haptic surfaces. Besides the display application, research has focused on other interesting properties such as its special thermally and photogenerated macroscale mechanical responses, which means they can be good actuators.

LCEs are used to make actuators and artificial muscles for robotics. They have been studied for use as lightweight energy absorbers, with potential applications in helmets, body armor, vehicle bumpers, using multi-layered, tilted beams of LCE, sandwiched between stiff supporting structures.

Synthesis

Polymeric precursors 
LCEs synthesized from the polymeric precursors can be divided into two subcategories:

Poly(hydrosiloxane): A two-step crosslinking technique is applied to derive LCEs from poly(hydrosiloxane). Poly(dydrosiloxane) is mixed with a monovinyl-functionalized liquid crystalline monomer, a multifunctional vinyl crosslinker, and catalyst. This mixture is used to generate a weakly crosslinked gel, in which the monomers are linked to the poly(dydrosiloxane) backbones. During the first crosslinking step or shortly after that, orientation is introduced into the mesogen cores of the gel with mechanical alignment methods. After that, the gel is dehydrated and the crosslinking reaction is completed. Therefore, the orientation is kept in the elastomer by crosslinking. In this way, highly ordered side chain LCEs can be produced, which are also called single-crystal or monodomain LCEs.

LCPs: With LCPs as precursors, a similar two-step method can be applied. Aligned LCPs mixed with multifunctional crosslinkers directly generate LCEs. The mixture is first heated to isotopic. Fibers are drawn from the mixture and then crosslinked, thus the orientation can be trapped in the LCE. However, it is limited by the difficulty of processing caused by the high viscosity of the starting material.

Low molar mass monomers 
Liquid crystal low molar mass monomers are mixed with crosslinkers and catalysts. The monomers can be aligned and then polymerized to keep the orientation. One advantage of this method is that the low molar mass monomers can be aligned by not only mechanical alignment, but also diamagnetic, dielectric, surface alignment. For example, thiol-ene radical step-growth polymerization and Michael addition produce well-ordered LCEs. This is also a good way to synthesize moderately to densely crosslinked glassy LCNs.

The main difference between LCEs and LCNs is the cross link density.  LCNs are primarily synthesized from (meth)acrylate-based multifunctional monomers while LCEs usually come from crosslinked polysiloxanes.

Properties
A unique class of partially crystalline aromatic polyesters based on p-hydroxybenzoic acid and related monomers, liquid-crystal polymers are capable of forming regions of highly ordered structure while in the liquid phase. However, the degree of order is somewhat less than that of a regular solid crystal. Typically, LCPs have a high mechanical strength at high temperatures, extreme chemical resistance, inherent flame retardancy, and good weatherability. Liquid-crystal polymers come in a variety of forms from sinterable high temperature to injection moldable compounds. LCPs can be welded, though the lines created by welding are a weak point in the resulting product.  LCPs have a high Z-axis coefficient of thermal expansion.

LCPs are exceptionally inert. They resist stress cracking in the presence of most chemicals at elevated temperatures, including aromatic or halogenated hydrocarbons, strong acids, bases, ketones, and other aggressive industrial substances. Hydrolytic stability in boiling water is excellent. Environments that deteriorate the polymers are high-temperature steam, concentrated sulfuric acid, and boiling caustic materials.

Polar and bowlic LCPs are ferroelectrics, with reaction time order-of-magnitudes smaller than that in conventional LCs and could be used to make ultrafast switches. Bowlic columnar polymers possess long, hollow tubes; with metal or transition metal atoms added into the tube, they could potentially form ultrahigh-Tc superconductors.

Uses
Because of their various properties, LCPs are useful for electrical and mechanical parts, food containers, and any other applications requiring chemical inertness and high strength. LCP is particularly good for microwave frequency electronics due to low relative dielectric constants, low dissipation factors, and commercial availability of laminates. Packaging microelectromechanical systems (MEMS) is another area that LCP has recently gained more attention. The superior properties of LCPs make them especially suitable for automotive ignition system components, heater plug connectors, lamp sockets, transmission system components, pump components, coil forms and sunlight sensors and sensors for car safety belts. LCPs are also well-suited for computer fans, where their high tensile strength and rigidity enable tighter design tolerances, higher performance, and less noise, albeit at a significantly higher cost.

Trade names
LCP is sold by manufacturers under a variety of trade names. These include: 
 Zenite
 Vectra
 Laperos
 Zenite 5145L is a liquid crystal polymer with 45% glass fiber filler, originally developed by DuPont, which is used for injection molded parts with intricate features. Typical uses include electronic packaging, housing. etc. The heat deflection temperature is 290 °C. Relative Temperature Index (RTI considering strength but not impact or flexing) is 130 °C. The density is about 1.76 g/cm3.  The typical tensile strength at room temperature is 130 MPa (19 ksi). Melting temperature 319 °C. The Deflection Temperature Under Load (DTUL) is 275 °C.

References

External links
Prospector
Bowlic liquid crystal from San Jose State University

Polymers
Liquid crystals
Thermoplastics

ja:液晶ポリマー